Jennifer Scott is a singer and pianist born in Vancouver, BC, Canada. She specializes in jazz, blues, and world music.

Career
Scott grew up in Blueridge, a neighbourhood in the District of North Vancouver; a suburb of the city of Vancouver, BC, Canada  She developed an interest in jazz from the choir director at Windsor Secondary school. In her teens in the 1970s she heard visiting musician Clark Terry. She studied jazz at Vancouver Community College and classical music at University of British Columbia.

She has recorded cover versions of pop songs that are unusual to jazz, such as "It's My Party" by Lesley Gore and "Tupelo Honey" by Van Morrison.

Discography
 Interactive (1994)
 Live at Monk's (2001)
 Something to Live By (2002)
 Emotional Girl (2005)
 Live at the Cellar (Cellar Live, 2007)
 Mile 41 (2007)
 Crossing Borders (2008)
 Storybook (2009)

References

Canadian women jazz singers
Canadian jazz pianists
Canadian women pianists
Living people
1964 births
Musicians from Vancouver
21st-century Canadian pianists
21st-century Canadian women musicians
21st-century women pianists